Reclaiming the Dead Sea Scrolls is a book was written by Lawrence Schiffman, published in 1994 by Doubleday, as part of the Anchor Research Library. The book's aim was to explain the true meaning of the Dead Sea Scrolls for Judaism and Christianity. Previous to the publication of the book, many exaggerated and irresponsible claims about the scrolls were published. Reclaiming the Dead Sea Scrolls, according to itself, “sets before the public the real Dead Sea Scrolls.”

The book sets forth the author's theory that the Dead Sea Scrolls were gathered at Qumran by a sect which left Jerusalem in the aftermath of the Maccabean Revolt. When the Hasmonean rulers accepted the rulings of the Pharisees, these Sadducees took up residence in the Judean desert.

Contents 
I. Discovery and Disclosure: Liberating the Scrolls
II. The Community at Qumran
III. Closing the Canon: Biblical Texts and Interpretations
IV. To Live as a Jew
V. Mysticism, Messianism, and the End of Days
VI. Sectarianism, Nationalism and Consensus

About the author 

Lawrence H. Schiffman (b. 1948) was appointed as the Vice-Provost of Undergraduate Education at Yeshiva University and Professor of Jewish Studies in early 2011. He had been the Chair of New York University's Skirball Department of Hebrew and Judaic Studies and served as the Ethel and Irvin A. Edelman Professor in Hebrew and Judaic Studies at New York University (NYU). He is a specialist in the Dead Sea Scrolls, Judaism in Late Antiquity, the history of Jewish law, and Talmudic literature.

References

1994 non-fiction books
Dead Sea Scrolls
Jewish literature